Jani is a surname, prevalent in the Indian subcontinent. It is a given name for males in Finland and Hungary, and for females in South Africa. 

Jani may refer to:

As a surname 
 A. N. Jani, Indian scholar and Indologist
 Alauddin Jani, governor of Bengal during the time of Mamluk dynasty
 Agha Jani Kashmiri, was an Indian screenwriter, former actor and Urdu poet
 Ayaz Jani, was a Sindhi-language poet
 Babajani Durrani, an Indian politician
 Chirag Jani (actor), an Indian film Actor
 Chirag Jani, an Indian cricketer
 Jagadish Jani, Indian politician
 Jyotish Jani, novelist, poet and short story writer from Gujarat, India
 Karan Jani, an Indian astrophysicist
 Masud Jani, the Governor of Bengal, 1247–1251 CE
  Mulji Jani, known as Gunatitanand Swami a Hindu spiritual teacher 
 Neel Jani, Swiss professional Porsche factory driver. His father is from India and his mother is German Swiss.
 Nirmal Jani, Indian cinematographer
 Purnamasi Jani, poet, social activist from India
 Réka Luca Jani, a Hungarian female tennis player
 Robert Jani, American event producer
 Prahlad Jani, Indian breatharian monk 
 Reshma Saujani, American lawyer 
 Sayyid Jani Shah, a Muslim Pir who accepted Dharma 
 Tushar Jani, business entrepreneur, investor, philanthropist

Places

 Baba Jani-ye Abd ol Mohammad, a village in Iran
 Chak Jani, a town in Pakistan
 Deh Jani, a village in Lorestan, Iran
 Jani Buriro, a village in Sindh, Pakistan
 Jani, Iran, a village in Sistan and Baluchestan Province, Iran
 Jandikhel (or Janikhel), a town in Khyber Pakhtunkhwa, Pakistan
 Jani Khurd, a village in India
 Mohammad Jani, a village in Iran
 Miranjani (or Miran jani), highest peak in Galyat Region, Pakistan
 Sangjani railway station (or Sang jani railway station), in Sangjani village, Rawalpindi district of Punjab province of the Pakistan
 Surjani Town, Sindh Pakistan

Other uses
 Banjani, was a tribe of Old Herzegovina
 Jāņi, a Latvian summer solstice festival
 Jani (film), a 2017 Kannada film
 Jani-King, a cleaning service company
 Jani (letter), a Georgian letter

See also
Janni (disambiguation)
Jyani (disambiguation)
Janis (disambiguation)
Jaani disambiguation
Alternate forms for the name John